Anton Igorevich Sinyak (born 30 January 1999) is a Russian football player. He plays for FC Chayka Peschanokopskoye.

Club career
He made his debut in the Russian Football National League for FC Zenit-2 Saint Petersburg on 17 July 2018 in a game against FC Tambov.

On 21 February 2020, he joined FC Tom Tomsk on loan until the end of the 2019–20 season.

References

External links
 Profile by Russian Football National League

1999 births
People from Kandalaksha
Living people
Russian footballers
Association football defenders
FC Zenit-2 Saint Petersburg players
FC Tom Tomsk players
FC Zenit Saint Petersburg players
FC Chayka Peschanokopskoye players
Sportspeople from Murmansk Oblast